Naser Babapour (born 6 November 1957) is an Iranian long-distance runner. He competed in the men's marathon at the 1988 Summer Olympics.

References

1957 births
Living people
Athletes (track and field) at the 1988 Summer Olympics
Iranian male long-distance runners
Iranian male marathon runners
Olympic athletes of Iran
Place of birth missing (living people)